Castle Fin is an unincorporated community in Clark County, Illinois, United States. The community was founded by Robert Wilson and platted in 1848. Wilson named Castle Fin after his hometown of Castle Finn in County Donegal, Ireland.

References

Unincorporated communities in Clark County, Illinois
Unincorporated communities in Illinois